7th Level was a video game development company based in Dallas, Texas and founded in 1993. Notable game titles by the company include: the three Monty Python games (with the aid of Python member Eric Idle); G-Nome (1997), a MechWarrior-style game; Helicops (1997), an anime-inspired game that featured arcade-style aerial combat; and Tracer, a game where the player hacked  computer systems distributed for cash by using a virtual avatar in the design of Neuromancer, Shadowrun, or Snowcrash-styled virtual worlds.

On November 17, 1997, 7th Level announced their intention to merge with Pulse Entertainment, in order to create P7 Solutions, an integrated solutions company. The following day, the distribution rights for the three Monty Python games were acquired by Panasonic Interactive Media, which ended 7th Level's involvement with the game's development and publishing. The merger announced between 7th Level and Pulse Entertainment was later cancelled in April 1998.

In February 1999, 7th Level merged with Street Technologies Inc. and formed a website named 7th Street.com, which later became learn.com, tutorials.com, and Taleo, which was acquired by Oracle Corporation in 2012. George Grayson, the co-founder of 7th Level, later founded The Imagination Station.

Before ceasing all game development, 7th Level had begun working on another title, named Dominion: Storm Over Gift 3. The partially-completed game was sold to Ion Storm to finish development.

Titles

References

Video game development companies
Video game companies established in 1993
Video game companies disestablished in 1998
Defunct video game companies of the United States
Video game companies based in Texas
Defunct companies based in Texas
Companies based in Dallas
1993 establishments in Texas
1998 disestablishments in Texas